Soekarno–Hatta International Airport , abbreviated SHIA or Soetta, formerly legally called Jakarta Cengkareng Airport (hence the IATA designator "CGK"), is the primary airport serving the Jakarta metropolitan area on the island of Java in Indonesia. Named after the first president and vice-president of Indonesia, Sukarno (1901–1970) and Mohammad Hatta (1902–1980), the airport is located at Benda, Tangerang and Cengkareng, West Jakarta, which is about 20 km northwest of Central Jakarta. Together with Halim Perdanakusuma International Airport, they served over 80 million passengers in 2019.

The airport commenced domestic operations on 1 May 1985 replacing the old over-capacity Kemayoran Airport. The airport was expanded in 1991 to replace Halim Perdanakusuma International Airport for international flights, which still serves domestic charter, VIP, private flights, and re-opened as a second commercial airport for domestic flights to relieve pressure over Soekarno-Hatta airport that is currently running overcapacity. The airport served 66.9 million passengers in 2018, ranked as 18th busiest airport in the world by Airports Council International, and the busiest in Southeast Asia. In recent years, the airport has received numerous awards and recognitions.

The airport often struggles to accommodate all flights at its current limit of 81 aircraft movements per hour. Although over capacity, a 2012 ACI survey declared that the airport is being operated safely. The two original runways suffer from pavement and strength issues, which limited the airport's capacity to serve large aircraft. To reduce congestion and to achieve a target to handle 100 flights per hour, a third runway opened in August 2019. Upgrades of the original two runways for safety and to accommodate wide-bodied aircraft are almost complete. The airport will be able to serve 100 million passengers annually by 2025 after completion of ongoing development work.

History 
Used between 1928 and 1985, Kemayoran Airfield was considered inadequate for further expansion because it was too close to the major Halim Perdanakusuma military airport. The civil airspace in the area became increasingly restricted, while air traffic increased rapidly, posing problems for international air traffic. In 1969, a senior communication officers meeting in Bangkok expressed these concerns. 

In the early 1970s, with the help of USAID, eight potential locations were analyzed for a new international airport, namely Kemayoran, Malaka, Babakan, Jonggol, Halim, Curug, South Tangerang and North Tangerang. Finally, the North Tangerang site was chosen; it was also noted that Jonggol could be used as an alternative airfield. Meanwhile, as an interim step, the Indonesian government upgraded the Halim Perdanakusuma airfield for use for passenger services. The old Kemayoran site was closed in 1985, and the land was later used for commercial and housing purposes.

Between 1974 and 1975, a Canadian consortium, consisting of Aviation Planning Services Ltd., ACRESS International Ltd., and Searle Wilbee Rowland (SWR), won a bid for the new airport feasibility project. The feasibility study started on 20 February 1974, with a total cost of 1 million Canadian dollars. The one-year project proceeded with an Indonesian partner represented by PT Konavi. By the end of March 1975, the study revealed a plan to build three inline runways, three international terminal buildings, three domestic buildings, and one building for Hajj flights. Three stores for the domestic terminals would be built between 1975 and 1981 at a cost of US$465 million and one domestic terminal including an apron from 1982 to 1985 at a cost of US$126 million. A new terminal project, named the Jakarta International Airport Cengkareng, began.

Design 

The airport's terminal 1 and 2 were designed by Paul Andreu, a French architect who also designed Paris–Charles de Gaulle Airport. One of the characteristics of the airport is the incorporation of the local architecture into the design and the presence of tropical gardens between the waiting lounges. These unique characteristics earned the airport the 1995 Aga Khan Award for Architecture. The runways run northeast–southwest. There are three parallel runways, two on the north side and one on the south side. The airport terminal took the plan of spanning fan, with the main entrances of terminals connected to a series of waiting and boarding pavilions via corridors. These waiting and boarding pavilions are connected to the airplanes through boarding bridges. Terminal 1 is on the southern side of the airport, while Terminal 2 and 3 are on the north side.

The airport concept is described as "garden within the airport" or "airport in the garden", as tropical decorative and flower plants fill the spaces between corridors, waiting and boarding pavilions. The boarding pavilions demonstrate local Indonesian vernacular architecture, particularly the roof, in the Javanese stepped-roof pendopo and joglo style. The interior design displays the diversity of Indonesian art and culture, with ethnic decorative elements taken from wooden carvings of Java, Bali, Sumatra, Dayak, Toraja to Papua. Another example is the railings of stairs, doors, and gates, which show the kala-makara (giant head and mythical fish-elephant creature) theme typical in ancient Indonesian temples such as Borobudur. Terminal 3, however, has a different architectural style—unlike the ethnic-inspired Indonesian vernacular architecture of terminals 1 and 2, terminal 3 uses the contemporary modern style of large glass windows with metal frames and columns.

Project phases 

Time was needed to allocate land and also determine the provincial border. Authorities at Amsterdam Airport Schiphol were consulted about the airport plans, and concluded that the proposal was rather expensive and over-designed. The cost rose because of using a decentralized system. The centralized system was seen as a more suitable option. The team, however, chose the latter, similar to Orly Airport, Lyon Satolas, Hannover Airport and Kansas City Airport due to its simplicity and effectiveness.

On 12 November 1976, the building project tender was won by the French Aeroport de Paris. 6 months later, the final design was agreed on by the Indonesian government and Aeroport de Paris with a fixed cost of about 22,323,203 French francs and Rp. 177,156,000 equivalent to 2,100,000 francs. The work was scheduled to take 18 months. The government-appointed PT. Konavi as the local partner. The plan included 2 runways with taxiways, one access road in the east and one in the west (closed to public use) for airport services, 3 terminals capable of accommodating 3 million passengers per year, and 1 module for international flights and 2 for domestic. "An airport inside a garden" was chosen as the design idea.

On 20 May 1980, a four-year contract was signed. Sainraptet Brice, SAE, Colas together with PT. Waskita Karya were chosen to be the developers. Ir. Karno Barkah was appointed the project director, responsible for the airport's construction. On 1 December 1980, the Indonesian government signed a contract for Rp. 384.8 billion with developers. The cost structure was: Rp140,450,513,000 from the state budget, 1,223,457 francs donated by France and US$15,898,251 from the United States. The airport structure was completed exactly four years later. It was finally opened on 1 May 1985 for domestic flights, and the second circular terminal was opened exactly six years later for international operations.

Plans 
The capacity of the airport has increased from 22 million in 2014 to 62 million in 2017, but the airport handled more than 63 million passengers in 2017. Therefore, plans to build the fourth passenger terminal is already underway. Angkasa Pura II, as the operator, designed Soekarno–Hatta Airport to have 3 passenger terminals, 1 new freight terminal (cargo village) and an 'Integrated Building', that will be built in between Terminal 1 and 2. Also, there will be an increase in apron capacity from 125 airplanes to 174 airplanes.

An airport train to Manggarai Station and a people mover for ground transportation to, from and inside the airport were also planned. The free Skytrain began operations in September 2017 while the airport train started commercial service in December 2017.

In the first stage, Terminal 3 will be expanded. Terminal 1 and Terminal 2 will be integrated with green walls and the airport will have a convention hall, shopping center, hotel, playground, recreational facilities and parking area for 20,000 vehicles.

To anticipate a surge in passenger numbers, at least a ten percent increase each year, the government made plans to build a third runway. By May 2019 the construction progress reached 70 percent. 2500 meters of the runway began operational on 15 August 2019. The third runway will be expanded to 3000 metres by the end of 2019. With the opening of the third runway, capacity was increased to 114 flights per hour, up from 81 flights per hour.

The expansion plan was rejected by the Tangerang Municipal Government because the residents living around the airport would lose their jobs. The local government offered another location such as in Balaraja, but Angkasa Pura II corporate secretary said that building a new airport would not be an easy task, as it requires a thorough study. Finally, Angkasa Pura II only used 134 hectares of land and appraisal will be used to buy the land. It can be done due to a new design for the third runway.

To accommodate 86 aircraft movements per hour from the current 72 movements per hour, since 2016 the airport authority has been developing an east cross taxiway costing Rp 1.15 trillion ($86.1 million) to connect the existing Runway 1 and Runway 2. The east cross taxiway was finished and opened in December 2019.

Terminals 
There are three main terminal buildings; Terminal 1, Terminal 2 and Terminal 3. The airport also has a dedicated freight terminal for domestic and international cargo.

After renovations and expansions of Terminal 3, the current capacity of Soekarno–Hatta is 51 million, but the airport served 54 million passengers in 2015, making it the 18th busiest airport in the world, and the busiest airport in the Southern Hemisphere. There are non-stop flights to a large number of destinations in Asia and Australia, and several flights to Europe daily, ranking as the 17th most connected airport in the world, and the largest megahub in Asia according to OAG.

Terminal 1 and Terminal 2 are currently under renovation. The renovation works is targeted to be completed by 2021. The revitalization project is expected to double the number of passengers of the two terminals up to 36 million a year. Terminal 1 caters to domestic Low cost carrier, while Terminal 2 caters to international Low cost carriers. Terminal 3 will become a full-service terminal for both domestic and international flights. The airport operator AP II has undertaken plan to build a fourth terminal at Soekarno-Hatta, which is expected to be completed by 2024.

Terminal 1 
Terminal 1 is the first terminal built and was opened in 1985. It is located on the southern side of the airport, opposite Terminal 2. Terminal 1 has 3 sub-terminals, each equipped with 25 check-in counters, 23 aerobridges, 5 baggage carousels, and 7 gates. It has the capacity to handle 9 million passengers per annum.

The gates in Terminal 1 have a prefix of A, B or C. The gates are A1–A7, B1–B7 and C1–C7. In the latest masterplan, Terminal 1 will have its capacity increased to 18 million passengers per annum. Terminal 1 is used for domestic flights except for those operated by Garuda Indonesia, Sriwijaya Air, NAM Air, Indonesia AirAsia. Terminal 1A is home to Lion Air domestic flights (except to Sumatra & Bali). Terminal 1B is home to Lion Air domestic flights (only to Sumatra and Bali). Terminal 1C initially was a home to Citilink (domestic flights) and Trigana Air Service. The terminal was converted into a domestic low-cost carrier terminal (LCCT) in 2019. During the COVID-19 Pandemic, all flights in Terminal 1 were temporarily served at Terminal 2D and 2E to facilitate the renovation of Terminal 1, while Citilink moved all of its operation to Terminal 3. 
 After renovations completed, Terminal 1 will become a dedicated terminal for Lion Air flights.

Terminal 2 

Terminal 2 is the second terminal built, and was opened in 1991. It is located on the north-western side of the airport, opposite Terminal 1. Like Terminal 1, it has three sub-terminals, labeled as D, E and F, each of which has seven gates, 40 aerobridges and 25 check-in counters. Terminal 2 caters to umrah (minor hajj) flights and was converted into an international low-cost carrier terminal (LCCT) in 2019. Currently, Terminal 2 Domestic (2D & 2E) is home to Sriwijaya Air, Nam Air, Indonesia AirAsia, Super Air Jet and Batik Air's domestic flights, while Terminal 2 International (2F) is an international LCCT for AirAsia, Indonesia AirAsia, Thai AirAsia, Sriwijaya Air, Lion Air, Batik Air, Malindo Air, Thai Lion Air, Citilink, Jetstar Asia Airways, Cebu Pacific and Scoot international flights. During the COVID-19 Pandemic, all international flights served on Terminal 2F were temporarily served at Terminal 3 to facilitate the renovation of Terminal 2F.

Terminal 3 

Terminal 3 is the airport's newest and largest terminal. It is used as a base for Garuda Indonesia and Citilink Indonesia and serves as a full-service terminal for both international and domestic flights.

The original Terminal 3 was officially opened for international flights on 15 November 2011, when all Indonesia AirAsia flights started using Terminal 3 as its new base for international, as well as domestic flights. It was built to cater to low-cost carriers. The terminal was located on the north-eastern side of the airport.

On 9 August 2016, a new passenger terminal named 'Terminal 3 Ultimate', was officially opened. The original Terminal 3 was revamped and integrated into the new Terminal 3 Ultimate. Unlike Terminal 1 and 2, the Terminal 3 Ultimate architectural style is vastly different, using an eco-friendly contemporary modern design. It is equipped with 10 international gates, 18 domestic gates, 112 check-in counters, 59 aerobridges and 10 bus gates.

In 2018, the terminal's west pier (Pier 1) was extended. 8 new aerobridges were added, with 7 catering to wide-body aircraft and 1 catering to narrow-body aircraft.

Terminal 3 is equipped with BHS level 5 to detect bombs, an Airport Security System (ASS) which can control up to 600 CCTVs to detect faces who are available in the security register, an Intelligence Building Management System (IBMS) which can control uses of water and electricity (eco-green), rainwater system to produce clean water from rain, a recycled water system to produce toilet water from used toilet water, and illumination technology control to illuminate the terminal depending on the weather surrounding the terminal. Terminal 3 will be able to serve 60 airplanes from the current 40 airplanes.

Terminal 4 
Angkasa Pura II has undertaken a plan to build Terminal 4, which will be located on the north side of runway 1, south of Terminal 3, and east of Terminal 1. Terminal 4 will be built at the 4th stage as part of the development of the airport. The terminal will be built on 130 hectares of land, which will be able to serve 45 million passengers annually. The terminal will be designed in the form of an 'H' and use eco-friendly and modern design, similar to the design of Terminal 3. The terminal is expected to be operational by 2024.

Freight terminal 
The freight terminal is located on the east side of terminal 1. This terminal was used to handle cargo at the Soekarno–Hatta International Airport, both domestic and international cargo. In the latest master plan, the freight terminal will move to the west side of terminal 2 and have a larger capacity.

Navigation aids

Runway 07L/25R and 07R/25L are equipped with Instrument Landing System (ILS). The runways are also equipped with VOR/DME.

Airlines and destinations

Passenger 

  Ethiopian Airlines flights from Jakarta to Addis Ababa make a stop at Bangkok. However, the airline has no fifth freedom rights to carry passengers solely between Jakarta and Bangkok.

Cargo

Busiest routes 
Jakarta–Singapore is one of the world's busiest international air routes; passenger numbers of this route is growing fast. It was the second busiest international route in Asia after Hong Kong–Taipei in 2015. Singapore Airlines alone operates more than 70 weekly flights between Jakarta & Singapore. Jakarta Soekarno-Hatta–Surabaya route is ranked ninth busiest in the world by IATA in 2016. Jakarta–Singapore, and Jakarta–Kuala Lumpur routes are ranked within the top ten of world's busiest international air routes in 2018.

New traffic procedure 
To ease congestion, the airport authority implemented a new traffic procedure, the 72 Improved Runway Capacity (IRC 72), to handle 72 planes per hour. This limited a plane to 30–45 minutes only for arrival and unloading of passengers, to allow other planes to use the parking space. Gradually it has been implemented and on 26 June 2014 IRC 72 has been implemented fully for the period of 00:00 am to 01:30 am, 02:00 am to 10:00 am and 11:30 pm to 00:00 am with occupancy periods for aircraft are reduced from 110 seconds to 90 seconds of takeoff and from 65 seconds to 50 seconds for landing. The low time is from 04:00pm to 10:00pm with only maximum 32 flights/hour. By 2015, IRC 72 will become IRC 86 with the opening of the new terminal. As a comparison, London Heathrow Airport, which has 2 runways like SHIA, can handle 100 flights per hour, so the target for SHIA has been revised to 92 flights per hour by 2015. As of July 2017, maximum flight frequency at Soekarno–Hatta International Airport had been increased to 81 take-offs and landings per hour to accommodate increasing demand from aviation companies.

Airport facilities 
Terminals 1 and 2 were designed to resemble a traditional joglo Javanese construction. The approach has been emphasized by the inclusion of well-maintained gardens located near all boarding areas. Terminal 3 and other new airport buildings use an eco-friendly and modern design.

Aircraft maintenance 
Maintenance facilities for aircraft in Soekarno–Hatta International Airport are supported by GMF AeroAsia (Garuda Maintenance Facility).
They include  of built-up structures, including four hangars, a spares warehouse, workshops, utility buildings, a ground support equipment building, chemical stores, an engine test cell, and management offices. In addition, GMF AeroAsia has an apron capable of handling up to 50 aircraft, taxiways, a run-up bay, and a waste treatment area, taking up .

Hangar 1 was built in 1991 and was designed for Boeing 747s. It can perform minor A and B checks. It can hold up to one narrow body and one wide-body jet. Hangar 3 is also . It normally holds up to 3 narrow-body aircraft but can be configured to hold up to one wide-body and one narrow body. It has 7 bays with 4 full docks, 6 roof-mounted cranes and one bay designed for McDonnell Douglas MD-11s, McDonnell Douglas DC-10s, and wide-body Airbus A330s aircraft. The Hangar 4 was opened in 2015 and was designed for narrow-body aircraft like B737s and A320s. It can handle 16 narrow-body aircraft at one time.

Golf course 
There is a golf course at the Soekarno–Hatta International Airport supported by the Cengkareng Golf Club. The golf course has been open since 1999. It is located on the left side of the airport main gate by the Sheraton Bandara Hotel. The Cengkareng Golf Club is in the  Soewarna Business Park at Soekarno–Hatta International Airport. In 2005 and 2008, this golf course was used for Indonesia Open, a part of the PGA European Tour. There are 18 holes in the golf course.

Airport hotel 
Soekarno–Hatta International Airport has a hotel, the Bandara International Hotel, managed by AccorHotels. The Bandara International Hotel, which is located on the left side of the main exit road from the airport, has 4 floors with 220 guest rooms. The airport now has other hotels, including budget such as Ibis Styles, Pop! Hotels, Swiss-Belhotel, Orchard Hotel, Swiss-Belinn, Ibis Budget, and Amaris as an alternative. Terminal 3 of the airport has a Digital Airport Hotel or Capsule hotel with 120 rooms, which has Alpha-type and Beta-type rooms.

Lounges 
There are five airport lounges in the departure area. The Jasa Angkasa Semesta (JAS) Lounge is available for first and business class passengers of Cathay Pacific, Qantas, EVA Air, Saudia, and Singapore Airlines. The Pura Indah Lounge is available for first and business class passengers of Singapore Airlines, KLM, Malaysia Airlines, Emirates, Cathay Pacific, and China Airlines. The new Garuda Indonesia lounge is available for their business class and first-class passengers only, as well as GECC and GarudaMiles gold and above cardholders. The BNI Executive Lounge is located next to the Garuda Indonesia Lounge, the lounge serves passengers from all airlines. Other lounges are available outside of the departures area, operated by companies such as Indosat, Sapphire, PT Mandara Jasindo Sena, Telkomsel, and XL Axiata. As of 2020, the only airline lounge in Terminal 2 was opened named Batik Air Business Class Lounge inside the waiting room C7. The Garuda Indonesia lounge has been moved to Terminal 3 Ultimate.

Other facilities 

The airport contains the head office of Garuda Indonesia, Garuda Indonesia Management Building, located within the Garuda Indonesia City Center. Angkasa Pura II's head office is on the airport property. Sriwijaya Air has its head office at Sriwijaya Air Tower.

There are 21 reading corners located in the waiting rooms of Terminal 2D, 2E and 2F. Shopping areas are also available in all terminals. Duty-free shops, souvenir shops, restaurants, and a cafeteria can be found there. There is a new "Shopping Arcade" located in terminal 1C. There are no shops in the arrival zones of the terminals, except for Terminal 3, where several cafes and fast-food restaurant chains are located.

To handle the overcrowding of smoking rooms being used, airport authorities have drawn up plans to build a smoking area in a garden near the rest area in Terminal 1A. It was opened in January 2015 and it will be developed to other terminals, if necessary.

Ground transportation 
There are several transportation options available for access to the airport: local airport terminal shuttles, trains, buses, taxi services of various kinds, and cars. There is a free shuttle bus service and people maneuver system Skytrain to connect the terminals of the airport.

Bus 
Several bus companies, including the state-owned Perum DAMRI and private company Primajasa, provide services to various destinations from the airport. Jabodetabek Airport Connexion which consist of Perum DAMRI, Perum PPD, Big Bird dan Sinar Jaya Megah Langgeng serve routes from the airport to certain malls and hotels in Greater Jakarta. The buses operate from 06.00 to 23.00 with routes:

Travel time to and from the center of Jakarta (at the Gambir Station) takes around 70 minutes, depending on traffic. Buses to the airport leave from the various terminals in central Jakarta (Gambir) and surrounding areas.

BUS – Shuttle service

JA Connexion Bus 
Greater Jakarta Transportation Agency (BPTJ) operates this service. The routes are:
 Hotel Borobudur-Hotel Alia-Hotel Luminor-Airport
 Hotel Aryaduta-Hotel Sari Pan Pacific-Airport
 Hotel Grand Cemara-Hotel Ibis Thamrin-Hotel Milenium-Airport
 Hotel Sahid Jaya-Mall Grand Indonesia-Hotel Ascot-Airport
 Hotel Amaris Thamrin City-Airport
 Hotel Sahid Jaya Lippo Cikarang-Airport
 Bogor Trade Mall-Airport
 Mall Taman Anggrek-Airport
 Mall Plaza Senayan-Airport
 Mall ITC Cempaka Mas-Airport
 Mall Kelapa Gading-Airport
 Pondok Indah Mall-Airport
 Summarecon Serpong-Airport
 ITC Tanah Abang-Airport
 Bubulak-Bukit Cimanggu City (Bogor Icon)-Sentul-Airport
 Pondok Gede (Transmart Atrium) – Airport
 Taman mini (Tamini Square) – Airport

Inter-terminal shuttle service 
Soekarno–Hatta International Airport provides a free shuttle bus that connects Terminals 1, 2 and 3.

Taxicab 
The airport is connected to Jakarta's city center via the Prof. Dr. Ir. Soedijatmo Toll Road. There is extensive car parking, including long-stay facilities, at the airport.
Various taxi and shuttle services are provided by several operators.

Rail

Skytrain (inter-terminal shuttle service) 

The plan to build an airport automated people mover system to connect Terminals 1, 2, and 3, and the Airport Rail Link Station, was announced in 2013. Starting on 17 September 2017, the people mover, named Skytrain, is officially opened to connect Terminal 3 and Terminal 2 vice versa, with a headway of 5 minutes. One set of Skytrain can serve 2x88 passengers. It temporarily operates from 07.00 to 10.00, 13.00 to 14.00 and 17.00 to 19.00.

Airport rail link 

Soekarno–Hatta Airport Rail Link connects Jakarta city center with the airport. The train takes 45–55 minutes from  station at South Jakarta to  station. Each train accommodates up to 272 passengers and will serve about 35,000 passengers with 122 trips a day, when fully operational. There is a 30 minutes interval between the train departures. As Manggarai station is under renovation,  station is being temporary as the terminus for the city center. Trips from Soekarno-Hatta to BNI City runs from 6.10 a.m. to 11.10 p.m., departing every hour.

An express line between Halim Perdanakusuma Airport and the airport is under planning stage, to be built by an investor as a public–private partnership. The express train will take 30 minutes to connect the airports. In early 2015, the government changed the fund from participation to not funding at all, so the contract for Rp 28 billion will be revised, including new rail express tariff. The construction of this line has been delayed and completion is now projected to be in 2019 at the earliest.

Accidents and incidents 
 On 28 October 1997, a Trigana Air Service Fokker F-28 Fellowship 3000 passenger plane returned to land at Jakarta–Soekarno–Hatta International Airport after the aircraft experienced technical problems two minutes after takeoff. Smoke and severe heat had entered the cockpit and the passenger cabin. The airplane sustained damage due to the heat.
 On 18 December 1997, SilkAir Flight 185, A Boeing 737-36N 9V-TRF crashed into the Musi River, The pilot Tsu Way Ming locked the co pilot Duncan Ward out of the cockpit and disabled the transponder, CVR and FDR before plunging the aircraft from 35,000 feet into a power dive which was so fast and powerful parts of the aircraft disintegrated before crashing into the river, All 104 passengers on board were killed.
 On 23 January 2003, a Star Air Boeing 737 touched down  past the threshold of runway 25L, a little left of the centerline, at a time of heavy rainfall with associated heavy winds. It went off the side of the runway, causing substantial damage to the aircraft's undercarriage and belly.
 2003 Soekarno–Hatta International Airport bombing – On 27 April 2003, a bomb exploded in terminal 2, departure hall of the domestic terminal. The bomb was hidden under a table of a KFC stall and exploded during lunch hours. 10 people were injured in the blast, one 17-year-old teenager identified as Yuli was seriously injured. Her legs had to be amputated. Emergency services were rushed to the scene and suspected that the motive of the bombing was due to the Free Aceh Movement, a separatist movement in Aceh. This was proved by the location of the blast, which was located on the domestic passenger hall rather than on the international passenger hall.
 On 11 August 2003, a Garuda Indonesia Fokker F-28 Fellowship 3000R suffered a left main gear collapse after a flight from Surabaya.
 On 9 March 2009, a Lion Air MD-90 overran runway 25L, due to an unstable approach  before the runway in rainfall and strong winds, in which the aircraft touched down to the left of the centerline. Although its thrust reversers were functioning, it veered to the right, resulting in the aircraft resting 90 degrees off the runway.
On October 29, 2018, Lion Air Flight 610, a Boeing 737 MAX 8 registration PK-LQP, plunged into the Java Sea 13 minutes after takeoff from Soekarno–Hatta International Airport. The flight was a scheduled domestic flight to Depati Amir Airport, Pangkal Pinang, Indonesia. All 189 people on board were killed .
 On 9 January 2021, Sriwijaya Air Flight 182, a Boeing 737-524 PK-CLC plunged into the Java Sea 6 minutes  after taking off from Jakarta international airport. The flight was a scheduled domestic flight to Supadio International Airport, Borneo, All 62 people on board were killed.

Awards and recognitions 
In 1995, the landscaping of Soekarno–Hatta airport was awarded by Aga Khan Award for Architecture as one of the best examples of integrating the terminal building pavilions with lush tropical garden harmoniously.

Soekarno–Hatta International Airport was ranked fourth on the Skytrax World's Most Improved Airport 2014 list based on surveys of 12.85 million passengers from 110 countries. Skytrax also ranked Soekarno–Hatta International Airport as a 3-star airport.

In 2017, Soekarno–Hatta International Airport was ranked first on the Skytrax World's Most Improved Airport 2017.

According to air travel intelligence company OAG, the airport ranked as the 7th most connected airport in the world, and ranked first as 'megahub' airport in Asia-Pacific region as per connectivity index, ahead of Japan's Tokyo Haneda Airport and Australia's Sydney Airport. The airport ranked as the 7th most connected airport as 'megahub' in the world in 2017 again by air travel intelligence company OAG. The airport ranked as the 2nd most connected Low-Cost Megahub airport as 'megahub' in the world in 2018 by air travel intelligence company OAG. The airport was named the best airport by hygiene measures in Asia-Pacific in 2020 by Airports Council International.

Gallery

See also

References

External links 

 Soekarno–Hatta International Airport
 
 
 
 Sound recording from inside Soekarno–Hatta airport
 rental mobil bandara Soekarno–Hatta Jakarta

 
Airports established in 1985
1985 establishments in Indonesia